is a female Japanese former volleyball player who competed in the 1968 Summer Olympics.

In 1968 she was part of the Japanese team which won the silver medal in the Olympic tournament. She played all seven matches.

External links
 Yukiyo Kojima's profile at Sports Reference.com

1945 births
Living people
Olympic volleyball players of Japan
Volleyball players at the 1968 Summer Olympics
Olympic silver medalists for Japan
Japanese women's volleyball players
Olympic medalists in volleyball
Asian Games medalists in volleyball
Volleyball players at the 1966 Asian Games
Medalists at the 1968 Summer Olympics
Medalists at the 1966 Asian Games
Asian Games gold medalists for Japan
20th-century Japanese women